Kalanisi (foaled March 27, 1996 in Ireland) is a Thoroughbred racehorse who won European Champion and American Champion honors in 2000.

Background
Bred and raced by H.H. Aga Khan IV, Kalanisi was out of the mare Kalamba, a daughter of Green Dancer, a Champion sire in France who was a son of the English Triple Crown winner, Nijinsky. Kalanisi was sired by Doyoun, winner of the 1988 British Classic Race, the 2,000 Guineas Stakes. Doyoun was a son of Mill Reef whose multiple Group One wins included The Derby and Prix de l'Arc de Triomphe and who was voted 1971's European Horse of the Year.

Racing career

1999: three-year-old season
Trained by Sir Michael Stoute, Kalanisi won all three starts as a three-year-old

2000: four-year-old season
then at age four, won the then Group 2 Queen Anne Stakes and the Group 1 Champion Stakes in England plus earned a second in two other Group 1 races. Shipped to the United States for the November 4, 2000 Grade 1 Breeders' Cup Turf at Churchill Downs, under jockey Johnny Murtagh Kalanisi won the race by defeating runner-up Quiet Resolve as well as the betting favorite Montjeu plus other top international runners such Fantastic Light, and Manndar. It was the Aga Khan's second win of the Breeders' Cup Turf as an owner, having won with Lashkari in 1984's inaugural running.

2001: five-year-old season
Racing at age five, Kalanisi won two of five starts and notably was second in June's Group 1 Prince of Wales's Stakes at England's Ascot Racecourse. Injured in the race, he was retired to stud duty at his owner's Gilltown Stud in County Kildare, Ireland.

Assessment
Kalanasi's performances in 2000 earned him the American Eclipse Award as U.S. Champion Male Turf Horse and the Cartier Racing Award as European Champion Older Horse.

Stud career
Kalanisi has been the sire of more than one hundred and forty foals of which, as of mid-2008, thirty-five have been race winners. Beginning in 2008 he has been standing at Boardsmill Stud in County Meath.

Commemoration
Tha 'Kalanisi Building' at the Royal Veterinary College, Hatfield, England, was named in Kalanisi's honour on August 4, 2010.

References
 Kalanisi's pedigree and partial racing stats
 Kalanisi at Boardsmill Stud

1996 racehorse births
Racehorses bred in Ireland
Racehorses trained in the United Kingdom
Breeders' Cup Turf winners
Eclipse Award winners
Cartier Award winners
Thoroughbred family 12-c